Rhodoprasina nanlingensis is a species of moth of the family Sphingidae. It is known from Hunan and Guangdong in China.

The wingspan is about 86 mm. The forewing is relatively short and broad. The head, thorax, abdomen and forewing uppersides are reddish ochreous. The ground colour of the hindwing upperside is more reddish than the forewing and the undersides of both wings are reddish ochreous.

References

Rhodoprasina
Moths described in 2003